Saurauia clementis is a species of flowering plant in the family Actinidiaceae. It is endemic to the Philippines. Elmer Drew Merrill, the American botanist who first formally described the species, named it after Mary Strong Clemens, the American botanist who collected the specimen that he examined.

Description
It is a bush or small tree. The leaves are dark on their upper side, paler below, and bristly on both surfaces. The leaves have 7–8 pairs of secondary veins emanating from their midribs. The leaf margins have bristly serrations. Inflorescences are axillary cymes with a few flowers organized on densely bristly peduncles  in length. 
The flowers have corollas that are 10 millimeters long with 5 lobes; each lobe is notched at the top. Each flower has a 3-chambered ovary. Each ovary contains numerous ovules.

Reproductive biology
The pollen of S. clementis is shed as permanent tetrads.

References

clementis
Endemic flora of the Philippines
Plants described in 1906
Taxa named by Elmer Drew Merrill